CSOA Forte Prenestino is a large self-managed social centre based in a squatted fort in Centocelle, Rome. It was occupied on May Day 1986. Forte Prenestino is an "important node of production of
cultural and political events" and hosts many groups and events across its 13 hectares.

History of fort
Forte Prenestina was built between 1880 and 1884. It was one of fifteen Roman forts constructed in this time and never used in battle. By the 1950s it was  derelict and from 1977 onwards it was used as a dump by the Municipality of Rome.

Occupation 
CSOA Forte Prenestino was occupied on May 1 1986, during a 'Festival of Non-Work.' CSOA (Italian: Centro Sociale Occupato Autogestito) means 'Occupied Self-Managed Social Centre.' The squatters cleaned the site and all the rubbish which had been dumped there was removed.

Activities

The size of the centre allows it to host many groups and activities. In 1996, Steve Wright wrote that: "Forte Prenestino plays an important role in its local community. It houses an exhibition gallery, practice rooms for bands, space for theatrical performances, a dark room, gymnasium, and cafe. Classes are held, there are regular film nights, courses on design and sculpture, and a documentation centre. Outside Rome, the Forte is best known for its music label, featuring local rap and reggae bands. It also produces the journal Nessuna Dipendenza, which documents the Forte's activities and engages in political discussion and debate."

The rap group Assalti Frontali built a recording studio at the fort in the 1990s. Many internationally known bands, for example Autechre, Fugazi (5 times) and Test Department have played at the centre.

There is also an antifascist gym. Other activities include an infoshop, a bicycle workshop, a children's playground, a garden with flora guide
and a herbalist shop. Organisations utilising different areas include a cinema, a bar, a theatre, a permanent exhibition area, a tattoo and piercing studio, a tea room and an organic farmers market.

References

 Buildings and structures in Rome
 Music venues in Italy
 Squats in Italy
Infoshops